Shirokovsky is an urban locality (an urban-type settlement) in Gubakha Urban Okrug, Perm Krai, Russia. Population:

References

Urban-type settlements in Perm Krai
Gubakha Urban Okrug